Vauquelinia californica, commonly known as Arizona rosewood, is an evergreen species of shrub or tree, in the rose family, Rosaceae.

The dark brown wood streaked with red, and is hard and very heavy, a beautiful 'rosewood.' It has dense white blossoms in early Spring.

Distribution
The plant is native to the Southwestern United States in Arizona and southwestern New Mexico in Madrean Sky Islands habitats, the Peninsular Ranges in Baja California and northern Baja California Sur, and Sonora in Northwestern Mexico.

Prehistoric
From pollen core data, a portion of the prehistoric distribution of Vauquelinia californica has been mapped. For example, in the Late Wisconsin period, this species occurred at lower elevations within the Waterman Mountains in southern Arizona than currently found.

Cultivation
Vauquelinia californica is cultivated as an ornamental plant. It is used as a drought-tolerant shrub, hedge, or small tree.

EcologyVauquelinia californica'' is a larval host for the two-tailed swallowtail.

References

Further reading

External links
Lady Bird Johnson database
University of Arizona: Vauquelinia californica

californica
Flora of the Sonoran Deserts
Trees of Baja California
Trees of Baja California Sur
Trees of the Southwestern United States
Trees of the South-Central United States
Garden plants of North America
Drought-tolerant plants
Plants described in 1848
Flora without expected TNC conservation status